The Gelt River is a river in the Canterbury region of New Zealand. It arises near Mount Peter in the Black Hills and flows south, then east and north-east into Conway River.

See also
List of rivers of New Zealand

References

Land Information New Zealand - Search for Place Names

Hurunui District
Rivers of Canterbury, New Zealand
Rivers of New Zealand